John William "Jake" or "Johnny" Madden (11 June 1865 – 17 April 1948) was a Scottish footballer who played for Dumbarton, Gainsborough Trinity, Grimsby Town, Celtic, Dundee, Tottenham Hotspur and the Scotland national team.

At Celtic, where he played for eight years, he won the Scottish Cup in 1892 (also losing in two other finals, adding to a defeat with Dumbarton in 1887) and the Scottish Football League title in 1892–93, 1893–94 and 1895–96, playing a leading role in their establishment as one of the leading clubs in the country, though he had been on the verge of leaving to join Sheffield Wednesday before  professional contracts were officially introduced in Scottish football in 1893.

He was capped twice by Scotland in 1893 and in 1895, both against Wales. He scored four times in an 8–0 win over Wales in March 1893. He also played for Dumbartonshire (3 caps / 4 goals), Glasgow (3 caps / 1 goal) and the Scottish Football League XI (4 caps / 2 goals).

Between 1905 and 1930, Madden was the manager of SK Slavia Praha, and is considered an important figure in the development of the sport in the Bohemia region (at that time another Scot, Johnny Dick, was in charge of Slavia's city rivals Sparta). A stand at Slavia's Eden Arena is named after him, and each year a supporter group pays tribute at his grave in Prague, where he lived until his death. Madden earned the nickname "The Codger".

He took charge of the Bohemian team during the UIAFA European Championship in 1911, defeating the AFA England team 2–1 in the final.

International goals
Scores and results list Scotland's goal tally first.

Honours

Player 
Dumbarton
Scottish Cup: Runner-up 1886–87
 Dumbartonshire Cup: Winner 1888–89
 Greenock Charity Cup: Runners-up 1888–89

Celtic
Scottish league champion: 1893, 1894, 1896
Scottish Cup: 1892

Manager 

SK Slavia Prague
Czechoslovak First League: 1925, 1928–29, 1929–30
Mistrovství/Středočeská: 1913, 1915, 1918
Czech Charity Cup: 1908, 1910, 1911, 1912
Central Bohemian Cup: 1922, 1925–26, 1927, 1927–28, 1929–30
Coupe des Nations Runner-up: 1930
Mitropa Cup: Runner-up: 1929

Bohemia
UIAFA European Championship: 1911

Individual
 Berlin-Britz Manager of the Decade (1910s)

Burial Plot 
Madden is buried in the historic Olšany Cemetery (Olšanské hřbitovy) which is the main cemetery in prague. The grave is located in Section 1 of Area 1, which is in the south east corner of the sprawling cemetery. The gravestone bears the red flag of SK Slavia Prague.

See also
 List of Scotland national football team hat-tricks

References

External links

 
 International stats at Londonhearts.com
 The Celtic Wiki profile
 John Madden (The Sons Archive - Dumbarton Football Club History)

1865 births
1948 deaths
Scottish footballers
Scottish football managers
Scottish expatriate football managers
Scotland international footballers
Celtic F.C. players
Expatriate football managers in Czechoslovakia
SK Slavia Prague managers
Scottish Football League representative players
Dumbarton F.C. players
Dundee F.C. players
Tottenham Hotspur F.C. players
Association football wingers
Scottish Football League players
Scottish expatriate sportspeople in Czechoslovakia
British emigrants to Czechoslovakia
Scottish people of Irish descent
Southern Football League players
Burials at Olšany Cemetery
Czech Republic national football team managers
Sportspeople from Dumbarton
Footballers from West Dunbartonshire